Abiyun al-Bitriq (fl. 630 CE) was a mathematician and a maker of astronomical instruments at the beginnings of Islam. He is mentioned in al-Qifti's Tarikh al-Hukama as Anibun, and al-Nadim's  Fihrist. His name is not certain, and it was probably Apion or Apion Patrikios. He wrote a book, now lost, titled "On Operating the Planispherical Astrolabe"

Notes

References

Bibliography
 
 
 
 

7th-century mathematicians
Patricii
7th-century Arabic writers
7th-century astronomers